The Great Rocksteady Swindle is the twelfth studio album from New York City ska band The Slackers.  It was released on April 20, 2010, on Hellcat Records.

The Great Rocksteady Swindle was intended to showcase a more spontaneous, less produced side of the band. The album was recorded in three days in Berlin while the band was on tour. All six members of the band were asked to contribute songs and a total of 25 tracks were recorded, 15 of which appear on the final album. It is the first Slackers album to feature songs written by all the members of the band.

The album title is a reference to the film The Great Rock 'n' Roll Swindle.

Track listing

Vinyl track listing

Side one
"Cheated"
"Because"
"A Long Way Off"
"The Same Everyday"
"Mr. Tragedy (extended)"

Side two
"Bo Evil"
"Tool Shed"
"Don't Look Back"
"How It Feels"
"Ain't No Sunshine"
"Thank You"

Personnel

Players
 Ara Babajian – drums
 Marcus Geard – bass
 Dave Hillyard – saxophone
 Jay Nugent – guitar
 Glen Pine – trombone, vocals
 Vic Ruggiero – organ, piano, vocals, harmonica

References

2010 albums
The Slackers albums